William Drake (1723–1796), was a British politician who sat in the House of Commons for 50 years between 1746 and 1796, eventually becoming Father of the House.
 
Drake was the son of Montague Garrard Drake, MP of Shardeloes, Buckinghamshire and his wife Isabella Marshall and was born on 12 May 1723. His father died when he was five. He was educated at Westminster School in 1738. He matriculated at  Brasenose College, Oxford on 2 October 1739 aged 16 and was created DCL on 12 April 1749.

The Drake family controlled both seats at Amersham and in 1746 he was returned as Member of Parliament for Amersham. From then on he was returned at every election until his death. 

Between 1758 and 1768 he rebuilt the house at Shardeloes in the Palladian style, of stuccoed brick. The architect and builder was Stiff Leadbetter and designs for interior decorations were provided by Robert Adam.

Drake died on 8 August 1796. He had married  Elizabeth Raworth, daughter of John Raworth of Basinghall St., London on 9 February 1747 and had 5 sons and 3 daughters. His eldest son William was MP for Amersham with him from 1768, but predeceased him in 1795.
Shardeloes passed to his second son, Thomas Drake Tyrwhitt-Drake.

References

1723 births
1796 deaths
People educated at Westminster School, London
Alumni of Brasenose College, Oxford
British MPs 1754–1761
British MPs 1761–1768
British MPs 1768–1774
British MPs 1774–1780
British MPs 1780–1784
British MPs 1784–1790
British MPs 1790–1796
Members of the Parliament of Great Britain for English constituencies